Benjamin Hayes "Vandy" Vandervoort (March 3, 1917 − November 22, 1990) was an officer of the United States Army, who fought with distinction in World War II. He was twice awarded the Distinguished Service Cross. He was portrayed by John Wayne in the 1962 war film The Longest Day.

Early life and military career
Vandervoort attended Washington College in Chestertown, Maryland, where he was a member of the Washington Players drama club, the YMCA, the Mount Vernon Literary Society, and the football and track teams. He was also an officer of the Theta Chi fraternity. He graduated with a Bachelor of Arts degree in 1938, having enlisted in the army as a private on 23 July 1937. He was commissioned with the rank of second lieutenant on 16 March 1938.

World War II
Vandervoort transferred to the newly established paratroopers in the summer of 1940, and was promoted to first lieutenant on 10 October 1941. Promoted to captain on 3 August 1942, almost eight months after the American entry into World War II, he served as a company commander in the 505th Parachute Infantry Regiment (PIR), commanded by Colonel James M. Gavin. He was promoted to major on 28 April 1943, a few weeks after the 505th had been assigned to the 82nd Airborne Division, then commanded by Major General Matthew Ridgway, and served as operations officer (S-3) in Colonel Reuben Tucker's 504th Parachute Regimental Combat Team in the Allied invasion of Sicily and in the landings at Salerno.

Promoted to lieutenant colonel on 1 June 1944, he was the commanding officer of the 2nd Battalion, 505th PIR, during the American airborne landings in Normandy. Vandervoort led his battalion in defending the town of Sainte-Mère-Église on 6 June in "Mission Boston", despite having broken his ankle on landing. During "Operation Market Garden" in September 1944, he led the assault on the Waal Bridge at Nijmegen while the 3rd Battalion, 504th PIR, made the assault crossing. Ridgway described Vandervoort as "one of the bravest and toughest battle commanders I ever knew". At Goronne he was wounded by mortar fire, so was unable to take part in the 82nd Airborne Divisions' advance into Germany in 1945.

Post war
He was promoted to colonel on 7 July 1946, and left the Army on 31 August. After studying at Ohio State University he joined the Foreign Service in 1947. He served as an executive officer in the Department of the Army in 1950-54, acting as joint political adviser to the commanding general United Nations forces and UN ambassador, Korea, in 1951-52, and studied at the Armed Forces Staff College (now the Joint Forces Staff College) in 1953. He served as a military attaché at the US embassy in Lisbon, Portugal, in 1955-58, and was assigned to the Department of State in 1958-60. He then served in the Executive Office of the Central Intelligence Agency (CIA), from 1960–66, also serving as a consultant on politico-military affairs to the US Army Staff in 1960, and as a plans and program officer on the Army Staff, Department of Defense, in 1964.

Benjamin Vandervoort died on November 18, 1990 at the age of 73 years at a nursing home from the effects of a fall.

He had two children with his wife Nedra; a son (Benjamin Hayes Vandervoort II) and a daughter (Marlin Vandervoort).

Awards and decorations

In the early 1990s, the United States Army Center for Leadership at Fort Leavenworth, Kansas, selected one or two colonels or lieutenant colonels from every American War from the Revolution to Vietnam. Colonel Vandervoort was selected as the outstanding ground battle commander for World War II. He is honored by a brief biography and several photographs in what is known as "Leadership Hallway" located on the second floor of Bell Hall.

Portrayed in film
Vandervoort was portrayed by actor John Wayne in the film version of Cornelius Ryan's history of D-Day, The Longest Day. The role was actively sought by Charlton Heston, but the last-minute decision of John Wayne to take a role in the film prevented Heston from participating. At the time of filming in 1962, Wayne was 55 – 28 years older than the 27-year-old Vandervoort had been on D-Day.

In museum

Original World War II uniforms and memorabilia of Col. Ben Vandervoort are on display at this museum:

D-DAY EXPERIENCE - Saint-Come-du-Mont - Normandy, France

References

Bibliography
Michel de Trez: Col. Ben Vandervoort "Vandy" 0-22715 (Way We Were), D-Day Publishing, 2004,

External links
The Liberation of Goronne
New York Times Obituary
Debriefing Conference - Operation Neptune, 82nd Airborne Division
Information on "Vandy" 
United States Army Officers 1939−1945

Joint Forces Staff College alumni
United States military attachés
Ohio State University alumni
United States Army personnel of World War II
United States Army colonels
American people of Dutch descent
Recipients of the Distinguished Service Cross (United States)
Recipients of the Croix de Guerre 1939–1945 (France)
Recipients of the Bronze Lion
Washington College alumni
1917 births
1990 deaths
People from Niagara County, New York
Military personnel from New York (state)
Accidental deaths from falls
Accidental deaths in South Carolina